Megachile submucida is a species of bee in the family Megachilidae. It was described by Alfken in 1926.

References

Submucida
Insects described in 1926